Stateburg is a census-designated place (CDP) in the High Hills of Santee in  Sumter County, South Carolina, United States. The population was 1,380 at the 2010 census. It is included in the Sumter, South Carolina Metropolitan Statistical Area. Stateburg is located within the larger Stateburg Historic District.

History
Stateburg is located within a larger area in which many notable colonial & early South Carolinians owned homes to which they escaped the summertime malaria & other illnesses, High Hills of Santee. In the 1780s, after the South Carolina General Assembly decided to move the state capital from Charleston to the central part of the state, Stateburg lost by only a few votes to a place called Granby's Ferry on the Congaree River near the confluence of the Broad and Saluda rivers.  Granby's Ferry soon was renamed Columbia, which is still the capital.

In 1785, Stateburg became the county seat of Claremont County and served as such until Claremont County was dissolved in 1800.

Borough House Plantation and Church of the Holy Cross are listed on the National Register of Historic Places.

Geography
Stateburg is located at  (33.978524, -80.524951).

According to the United States Census Bureau, the CDP has a total area of 4.7 square miles (12.2 km2), of which 4.7 square miles (12.1 km2) is land and 0.04 square mile (0.1 km2) (0.43%) is water.

Demographics

As of the census of 2000, there were 1,264 people, 461 households, and 389 families residing in the CDP. The population density was 270.3 people per square mile (104.3/km2). There were 477 housing units at an average density of 102.0/sq mi (39.4/km2). The racial makeup of the CDP was 72.55% White, 22.71% African American, 0.55% Native American, 2.06% Asian, 0.08% Pacific Islander, 0.32% from other races, and 1.74% from two or more races. Hispanic or Latino of any race were 2.69% of the population.

There were 461 households, out of which 38.6% had children under the age of 18 living with them, 73.5% were married couples living together, 6.5% had a female householder with no husband present, and 15.6% were non-families. 13.2% of all households were made up of individuals, and 2.2% had someone living alone who was 65 years of age or older. The average household size was 2.74 and the average family size was 2.99.

In the CDP, the population was spread out, with 26.8% under the age of 18, 6.6% from 18 to 24, 30.1% from 25 to 44, 29.9% from 45 to 64, and 6.6% who were 65 years of age or older. The median age was 38 years. For every 100 females, there were 98.7 males. For every 100 females age 18 and over, there were 96.4 males.

The median income for a household in the CDP was $59,152, and the median income for a family was $59,196. Males had a median income of $42,431 versus $26,875 for females. The per capita income for the CDP was $23,617. None of the families and 1.2% of the population were living below the poverty line, including no under eighteens and 7.9% of those over 64.

Notable people
 High Hills of Santee, notables here often were associated with Stateburg
 Richard H. Anderson, born in Stateburg, Confederate Army general
 Mary Boykin Chesnut, born in Stateburg, daughter of Stephen Decatur Miller and author of noted diary that chronicled life in the South during the Civil War
 Stephen Decatur Miller, U.S. congressman, state governor, and U.S. senator
 Thomas Sumter, American Revolutionary War general
 William Ellison, cotton gin maker and freed slave turned slave owner.
 Joel Roberts Poinsett, congressman, minister to Mexico, physician and botanist who died in Stateburg

References

External links

Census-designated places in Sumter County, South Carolina
High Hills of Santee
Census-designated places in South Carolina